Peter Wilt is a soccer executive who was the first President and General Manager of the Chicago Fire in Major League Soccer, led an effort to bring an expansion MLS franchise to Milwaukee, Wisconsin, and maintains strong connections to the sport of soccer in the Midwest, Chicago in particular. Wilt is most known for his work with the Chicago Fire, where he gained a reputation for being a fan-friendly businessman in the soccer world.

History 

Peter Wilt was born in McHenry, Illinois,  and gained his start in sports working for the Milwaukee Brewers baseball and Milwaukee Admirals hockey teams before breaking into soccer with the Milwaukee Wave.

Wilt was known for answering questions from fans through the BigSoccer Internet message boards, and now maintains his own blog on Chicago soccer issues.

In his seven seasons as Chicago's GM, the Fire won one MLS Cup, three U.S. Open Cups and one Supporters' Shield. In 2005, Wilt was fired by Anschutz Entertainment Group, the team's owner, a move which was protested by fans in Chicago. The following year, he became the chief executive officer of Milwaukee Professional Soccer (a group bidding to bring an MLS franchise to Milwaukee), but left the position to become CEO of the Chicago Red Stars Chicago's Women's Professional Soccer team that started play in 2009. After one season, Wilt left the Red Stars for a front office position with the Milwaukee Wave. After one season with the Wave, Wilt founded the now defunct expansion MISL side Chicago Riot.

In late 2012, Wilt led an effort with a group of Indianapolis, Indiana investors headed by Ersal Ozdemir to determine the viability of the market to support a North American Soccer League team in the city with eventual hopes to join MLS. On January 16, 2013, the league awarded Indianapolis the league's twelfth franchise, naming Wilt the team President that day. The team, known as Indy Eleven, began play in the 2014 season.

In January 2016, Wilt stepped down from his role with the Indy 11 to pursue an NASL team in Chicago. He later announced that works were in progress to secure short-term and long-term stadium options combined with exploring investors and supporter ownership structures.

On June 6, 2017, Wilt was announced that the newly formed National Independent Soccer Association would begin play in 2018 targeting an initial 8 to 10 teams, later revised to 8 to 12 teams. The league has also outlined plans to introduce a promotion/relegation system, once they reach their goal of 24 teams, the first in US professional soccer and in doing so act as a feeder league to the North American Soccer League.

On May 17, 2018, Wilt left the NISA to help start up a future professional team in Madison, Wisconsin of the USL League One, later named Forward Madison FC. A committee of club owners has been formed to elect new leadership within the organization.  Wilt was also named the managing director of Green Bay Voyageurs FC, Forward Madison's affiliate in USL League Two.

On October 24, 2019, Forward Madison announced Wilt's departure from the club in order to take a role with the USL.

References

External links
Chicago NASL
October 2004 Interview

Chicago Fire FC
Living people
Major League Soccer executives
People from McHenry, Illinois
Sports in Milwaukee
American soccer chairmen and investors
Indy Eleven
Forward Madison FC
1960 births